Rasstrigin is a rural locality (a khutor) in Dubrovskoye Rural Settlement, Kikvidzensky District, Volgograd Oblast, Russia. The population was 127 as of 2010. There are 6 streets.

Geography 
Rasstrigin is located on Khopyorsko-Buzulukskaya plain, on the left bank of the Buzuluk River, 17 km southwest of Preobrazhenskaya (the district's administrative centre) by road. Dubrovsky is the nearest rural locality.

References 

Rural localities in Kikvidzensky District